David J. Jackson is a political science professor at Bowling Green State University in Ohio.  He specializes in the relationships between entertainment and politics.  He holds a BA from the University of Detroit, an MA from BGSU, and a Ph.D. from Wayne State University.

References

Bowling Green State University faculty
Wayne State University alumni
Bowling Green State University alumni
Living people
Year of birth missing (living people)
American political scientists